Gevrey-Chambertin is a commune in the Côte-d'Or department of France in the Bourgogne-Franche-Comté region in eastern France.

This touristy, winemaking village is situated on the Route des Grands Crus in the Côte de Nuits. The village is noted for the Grand cru Burgundy wine that is produced from its vineyards, the most famous of which is Chambertin.

Geography
Gevrey-Chambertin is one of the wine villages of the Côte de Nuits which lies along the foot of the Côte-d'Or escarpment, to the south of Dijon and with the broad Saône valley plain to its east. It produces red Burgundy wine from vineyards at the village, Premier Cru and Grand Cru level.

The vineyards on the slope of the Côte d'Or form a strip below and east of the woodland on the Jurassic limestone hills. In the plain of the Saône to the east, there are large fields. The commune is also traversed by the A31 road and the railway from Dijon to the south with a large marshalling yard (Gevrey-Triage). There is also a stretch of Roman road from Dijon to the southern end of the Forest of Cîteaux, to the south of the abbey.

Population

History

Origins
As in England, Île de France and in the South of France, vines in Burgundy were planted very early on. Only in Gevrey-Chambertin, however, have archaeological digs been able to find Gallo-Roman vines dating back to the 1st Century BC. The outline of 120 vine stocks was discovered in 2008, during the expansion of a residential development that was updating 300 septic tanks all lined up in an area of 6 km2. This archaeological discovery corroborates with texts written by Pliny the Elder and Columella, making it credible that the Gallo-Roman vines in Gevrey-Chambertin were the first vines to be planted in Bourgogne. The vines were planted in rows, just as they would be today, but the choice of land used and its exposure were quite different: the Gallo-Roman vines were planted on plains, as opposed to the terraces that most of today's Côtes de Nuits is grown on. Furthermore, wines made from these vines would have had a different taste, notably because the Gallo-Romans added spices as preservatives.

Administration

Winemaking

The Gevrey-Chambertin winemaking area on the Route des Grands Crus of Côte de Nuits is one of the most well known areas in the wine region of Burgundy.  of vineyards planted to Pinot noir grapes are used to produce the village's red wine.

Gevrey-Chambertin is the source of 9 out of 33 Burgundy Grand crus AOC wines: Chambertin 12.9 ha, Chambertin-Clos-de-Bèze 15.4 ha, Chapelle-Chambertin 5.5 ha, Charmes-Chambertin 30.8 ha, Mazis-Chambertin 9.1 ha, Mazoyères-Chambertin 1.72 ha, Griotte-Chambertin 2.7 ha, Latricières-Chambertin 7.3 ha, Ruchottes-Chambertin 3.3 ha. Gevrey-Chambertin wines have high ageing potential (10 to 20 years, longer for some exceptions).

Sights
Route des Grands Crus
Château de Gevrey-Chambertin
The Combe de Lavaux (Nature Reserve)
The classification yard of Dijon's railway hub
The Chambertin vineyard.

Prominent people
 Maurice Boitel, 20th century French painter
 Gaston Roupnel, 20th century regionalist writer
 Alphonse de Lamartine, 19th century French poet and politician
 Jacques-Théodore Saconney, 20th century senior French army general, innovative scientific and adventurous balloonist (related to Gaston Roupnel)

International relations
The commune is twinned with Nierstein in the Rheinhessen wine region of Germany, and with the Belgian town Spy in the Namur province. The Albasso choir received the Sarteline choir of Sart-Bernard, Namur, from 24 to 25 March 2007. In its turn, the Gevrey-Chambertin choir went to Belgium from 1 to 2 March 2009. A return visit of the Belgian choir to the commune is currently being discussed.

Gallery

See also
 Communes of the Côte-d'Or département
 Chambertin
 Route des Grands Crus
 Château de Gevrey-Chambertin

References

External links

 Official site of the community of communes of Gevrey-Chambertin and Nuits-Saint-Georges
 Tourist information. In English.
 Gevrey-Chambertin's entry on the French National Geographic Institute website. In French.
 Demographic figures. In French.

Communes of Côte-d'Or